The Georges Creek and Cumberland Railroad (GC&C) was a railroad that operated in Maryland from 1876 until 1917, when it was merged with the Western Maryland Railway (WM). The main line ran from Cumberland to Lonaconing.

History

The GC&C was created by rival coal mining companies in the Georges Creek Valley to compete against the Consolidated Coal Company who dictated rail traffic over the Cumberland and Pennsylvania Railroad.  By 1887 the railroad crossed the town of Midland on a large wooden trestle. The rail line came through Clarysville and Vale Summit, and went south to Lonaconing to service the mines. The trestle was removed in the 1930s.

In addition to coal hauling, the GC&C provided passenger stations and service. A published schedule of the GC&C dated January 18, 1887, shows two trains per day from Cumberland to Lonaconing (except Sundays).

The GC&C also owned a branch line, acquired in 1888 from a company called Pennsylvania railroad in Maryland, that ran from Cumberland north to the Pennsylvania state line, where it connected with the Bedford and Bridgeport Railroad. The latter company was controlled by the Pennsylvania Railroad (PRR).

The Fuller Syndicate, led by George Gould, acquired a controlling interest in the GC&C in 1907, principally to obtain access to the route through the Cumberland Narrows. The WM (which had also been controlled by Gould until 1908) took over the GC&C operation in 1913, and a full merger was completed in 1917. WM abandoned large portions of the GC&C in 1927. The line from Cumberland to Midland was operated until 1939 when the track was abandoned. The State Line Branch to Pennsylvania was operated by the PRR until 1934.

See also

 Georges Creek Railroad (1853-1863)
 Georges Creek Railway (Short line railroad operating since 2007)
 List of defunct Maryland railroads

Notes

References

External links
 Railroad history website - mtnsub.org. "The Narrows."  Accessed 2018-10-11.

External links
 "Railroads of Midland" - historical information & photos

Defunct Maryland railroads
History of Cumberland, MD-WV MSA
Predecessors of the Western Maryland Railway
Railway companies established in 1876
Railway companies disestablished in 1917
Transportation in Allegany County, Maryland
1876 establishments in Maryland
American companies established in 1876